Eric Chou (Pha̍k-fa-sṳ: Chiu Hin-chet, born 22 June 1995) is a Taiwanese singer, songwriter and actor. He has been dubbed by the Taiwanese media as "king of the lovelorn people". Chou's self-composed smash hit "The Distance of Love", the ending theme of the 2014 Taiwanese drama The Way We Were, where he also made a cameo, reached 100 million views on YouTube, making Chou the youngest Mandopop artist to reach the feat at that time.

Life and career

1995-2014: Early life and career beginnings 
Eric Chou was born in Taiwan on 22 June 1995. He has two brothers—younger brother Jimmy/James, and older brother Alex (周予天) who is also active as a singer-songwriter.    At a young age, he learned chess to improve his character, and even won a championship. When he was nine, his uncle brought him to watch Jay Chou's concert rehearsal. "When I heard him sing ‘Hair Like Snow’, that was the moment I was determined to become a singer-songwriter like him," Chou said. At the age of twelve, he moved with his family to Boston in the United States, where he attended Fay School and Northfield Mount Hermon School. Chou recalled not being able to sit still when he first started learning the piano and had to be forced by his mother. However, playing the piano had become his outlet to express his emotions and started to play more during his spare time when he was in the US. His inspiration for songwriting comes from movies, his friends and personal experiences. During his time in Boston, he wrote the song, "The Distance of Love", inspired by his failed attempt to impress a girl he liked from high school. "I thought I'd really get into music to make myself appear more charming, and that was actually the initial motivation," Chou said. At eighteen, Chou returned to Taiwan due to his parents' work in Shanghai.

Chou was talent scouted by Taiwanese actor Edison Huang (黃懷晨) who heard from a friend that his son "can sing", and was asked to perform at his wedding with actress Queenie Tai when he was seventeen. He performed the song "The Distance of Love" which will eventually be chosen two years after as the ending theme of the Taiwanese drama The Way We Were where Tai also appeared. He also made his acting debut in the same drama by making a cameo as a singer.

2014-2016: Debut album and What Love Has Taught Us 
In August 2014, Chou released "The Distance of Love" as his first single under Sony Music Taiwan. The song will eventually appear in his debut studio album My Way to Love which was released on 24 December. The album went on to top 18 charts upon its release. He won the TV Theme Song Award for "The Distance of Love" at the Hito Music Awards in 2015.

In 2016, Chou served as a composer for the Chinese television series Magical Space-Time. He wrote three songs including "I Love You So" which was performed by his brother Alex Chou, "Fleeting Happiness" by Taiwanese singer A-Lin, and "Back to the Day" by Chou himself, and was used for the opening, ending, and theme song of the drama respectively. He also had his first leading role in a micro drama for a ramen brand and released the theme song, "I Loved You".

On 5 August 2016, Chou released his second studio album, What Love Has Taught Us. It contained his hit single "How Have You Been?" which topped the KKBOX Mandarin Weekly Singles Chart for 30 consecutive weeks, and its music video reaching 185 million views as of July 2022. The song earned him the title "king of the lovelorn people". The album achieved success, and a solo concert, "This Is Love", has been announced to promote the album. Tickets for the Taipei show in November sold out within two minutes. The concert kicked off in Singapore on October, followed by Taipei in November, and then in Malaysia. Chou also performed for Rock On! 2017, the largest countdown party in Singapore on 31 December 2016.

2017-2018: Second concert tour and The Chaos After You 
In 2017, Chou performed at the 12th KKBOX Music Awards where he received the Artist of the Year award, the youngest singer to do so. In February 2017, he held his Valentine's concert in Macau where he performed his new song "Unbreakable Love", as well as a cover of Hebe Tien's "A Little Happiness". On 21 May 2017, Chou performed in his sold-out concert in Taipei where he also announced that he's already working on his new album. In August 2017, he announced the ticket-selling for his second concert tour "22 TWENTY TWO" in Taipei and the tickets sold out within 6 minutes. A second date has been added and tickets also sold out within an hour. Chou wrapped up his concert tour "This Is Love" on October and commenced with his second concert tour "22 TWENTY TWO" in November, where he premiered his new song "Without Her" which will eventually appear on his new album. On 15 December 2017, Chou released his third studio album, The Chaos After You. The album contains ten songs, including the title track of the same name. He capped off the year by performing at Taoyuan New Year's Eve countdown party. 

In 2018, Chou won two awards at the Hito Music Awards including the friDay Digital Song Award for his song "The Chaos After You." In August 2018, he participated in the Tencent competition Chao Yin Idols where participants work with different artists to create a new musical style. During the competition, he co-wrote the song, "What's Wrong", with Chinese singer and actor Wu Jiacheng. The live version which they performed with Chinese singer Su Yunying was released digitally on Chinese streaming platforms on the same month. In November 2018, Chou appeared as the male lead in IQIYI web drama, The Elfin's Golden Castle. In December 2018, Chou released the single, "Nobody But Me", along with its music video.

2019-present: Freedom and When We Were Young 
On 10 January 2019, Chou released his first EP, Freedom, which consists of five tracks. It included the songs, "What's Wrong" and "Nobody But Me" which was released the previous year. At the 15th KKBOX Music Awards, Chou performed a medley of his songs, including "At Least I Remember" from his new EP. On 11 May 2019, Chou kicked off his concert tour "How Have You Been". It was his first time to perform in Taipei Arena in front of 11,000 fans. Tickets were reportedly sold out in two minutes. The concert also commenced in Kaohsiung Arena in August. In October 2019, Chou released his song "Forever Beautiful" in support for a breast cancer campaign.

In December 2019, Chou re-released a deluxe version of his EP Freedom as his fourth studio album which included the original five songs, and additional four new songs. Additionally, the music video for his song "What's Wrong" was hailed by YouTube to be the most viewed Mandopop music video, as well as the top 2 popular singer in Taiwan behind Jay Chou and above Jolin Tsai throughout 2019. Chou was also featured on G.E.M.'s song "Don't Force It".

On 7 January 2020, Chou released his fifth studio album, When We Were Young. The album consists of eleven tracks, including "I'm Happy".

On 8 August, Chou became the first singer to hold a concert at Taipei Arena since the COVID-19 pandemic started as part of his "How Have You Been Tour". The show was sold at full capacity, attracting 10,000 concertgoers. To raise funds for the COVID-19 pandemic, Eric Chou donated all proceeds from a new remake of "Forever Beautiful", sung together with other Asian Sony artists.

Personal life 
In January 2019, Chou announced that he has been in a relationship with Sanlih news anchor Dacie Chao, who is six years older than him, since March 2018, after previously denying the rumors. The couple broke up in October 2020 and got back together in 2021. Chou announced their engagement in October 2022 and revealed that he had proposed to Chao in Europe on a hotel balcony in March that year.

Discography

Albums

Extended plays

Singles

Filmography

Film

Television series

Television show

Tours and concerts

Concert tours 
 This Is Love (2016-2017)
 22 TWENTY TWO (2017)
 22 Plus (2018)
 How Have You Been (2019)
 How Have You Been Deluxe (2021)

Awards and nominations

Notes

References

External links 

 Eric Chou at Sony Music Taiwan
 
 

1995 births
Living people
21st-century Taiwanese male singers
Taiwanese male singer-songwriters
Mandopop singers
Northfield Mount Hermon School alumni
Fay School alumni